The 18th Sarasaviya Awards festival (Sinhala: 18වැනි සරසවිය සම්මාන උලෙළ), presented by the Associated Newspapers of Ceylon Limited, was held to honor the best films of 1988 Sinhala cinema on August 25, 1989, at the Bandaranaike Memorial International Conference Hall, Colombo 07, Sri Lanka. President Ranasinghe Premadasa was the chief guest at the awards night.

The film Siri Medura won the most awards with eight including Best Film.

Awards

References

Sarasaviya Awards
Sarasaviya